Tekeli is a village in the Şemdinli District in Hakkâri Province in Turkey. The village is populated by Kurds of the Zerzan tribe and had a population of 2,193 in 2022.

Tekeli has four hamlets attached to it; Balıklı, Üstünağaç, Tanyolu and Oğlaklı.

Population 
Population history of the village from 2013 to 2022:

References 

Villages in Şemdinli District
Kurdish settlements in Hakkâri Province